The 2010 Hong Kong–Shanghai Inter Club Championship was held on 6 November and 13 November 2010. The first leg was played at Yuanshen Sports Centre Stadium, Shanghai on 6 November, with the second leg taken place at Siu Sai Wan Sports Ground, Hong Kong on 13 November.

It was the first time in the competition history that it is held in a two-leg format.

Squads

Citizen

Shanghai East Asia
 Chairman: Xu Genbao
 Team manager: Yang Limin
 Head coach: Fan Zhiyi
 Coaches: Qiu Jingwei, Jia Chunhua, Wang Zhongchun
 Assistant coaches: Jiang Yong, Cheng Jianhua
 Physio: Sun Guozhu

Match details

First leg

Second leg

References

2010–11 in Hong Kong football
2010